Mekapati Vikram Reddy is an Indian politician who is serving as Member of 15th Andhra Pradesh Assembly from Atmakur Assembly constituency.

Personal life 
He is 49 years old. He is the younger brother of Mekapati Goutham Reddy and son of Mekapati Rajamohan Reddy. He is graduated from IIT Madras and has Master's Degree in Construction Management. In June 2022, he was congratulated by Y. S. Jagan Mohan Reddy, Chief Minister of Andhra Pradesh.

References 

Indian politicians

1973 births
Living people